The Quetta Gladiators is a franchise cricket team that represents Quetta in the Pakistan Super League. They were one of the six teams that competed in the 2019 season. 

The team was captained by Pakistani Skipper Sarfraz Ahmed, coached by Moin Khan and mentored by Viv Richards, while Abdul Razzaq served as Assistant Coach. 
They became the Champions for the first time ever, after being the Runners-up  twice in 2016 and 2017 seasons. They became champions after defeating their arch-rivals Peshawar Zalmi in the final on 17 March at National Stadium. They finished second after the completion of their group stage matches, winning seven matches from their ten matches. They defeated Peshawar Zalmi in the Qualifier to reach the finals. 

Australian player Shane Watson was team's and season's best batsman with 430 runs from 12 matches. He won the Green Cap and Hanif Mohammad award for best batsman of the season, while Sohail Tanvir with 15 wickets from 12 matches was the leading wicket taker for the team and finished in top five bowlers of the season.

Squad 
 Players with international caps are listed in bold.
Ages are given as of the first match of the season, 14 February 2019

Season standings

Points table

Season summary
Gladiators finished the group stage with second position by winning seven of their matches and losing three. They then defeated Peshawar Zalmi in the qualifier by 10 runs to reach the final.

In the final in Karachi, Gladiators won the toss and elected to field. Gladiators restricted Zalmi to 138-8 in 20 overs with pacer Mohammad Hasnain finishing his four overs with the figures of 3-30 and Dwayne Bravo finishing with 2-24. In the second innings, Ahmed Shehzad scored unbeaten 58 runs off 51-balls. Rilee Rossouw, who made 39 not out off 32 balls, took the winning single. Gladiators achieved the target in 17.5 overs defeating Peshawar Zalmi by 8 wickets to win their first title. Gladiators' Hasnain was awarded man of the match award.

Reference

External links

2019 in Balochistan, Pakistan
2019 Pakistan Super League
Gladiators in 2019
2019